Leinster Senior Cup may  refer to:

 Leinster Club Senior Cup: rugby union
 Leinster Schools Senior Cup: rugby union 
 Leinster Senior Cup (association football)
 Leinster Schoolgirls' Senior Cup (field hockey)
 Leinster Senior Cup (cricket)